Waybuloo is a children's television series created by Dan Good and Absolutely Cuckoo. It was commissioned by Michael Carrington at the BBC, and first aired on CBeebies in May 2009. The 100-episode show was head-written by Marc Seal (who worked on Bob the Builder), filmed by the Foundation in Glasgow and animated and directed by Gallus Entertainment.

The Piplings practice yogo, a gentle form of exercise similar to yoga, which the viewers and their parents can participate in.

The program makers describe it as "...a philosophy for a happy life, and is like nothing adults will have ever seen before".

Characters

Main characters 
Lau Lau
Colour:  Purple
Lau Lau is a Pipling resembling a rabbit. She has a purple-coloured body, fair skin, green eyes, long ears on top of her head, and a white cottontail. She wears a two-piece white dress. Lau Lau loves painting and can often be seen behind her easel. She is best friends with Yojojo. She is voiced by Georgia MacPherson.
Yojojo
Colour:  Orange
Yojojo is a Pipling resembling a monkey. He has an orange-coloured body, fair skin, blue eyes, and has peach rounded monkey ears on the side of his head. He has four thick tufts rising above his right ear which flop over to his left and has a long tail. In Peeka, he is often seen hiding in a log with his tail peeking out. He wears a pair of blue underpants. Yojojo loves playing music and juggling. He is best friends with Lau Lau. He is voiced by Finlay Christie.
Nok Tok
Colour:  Blue
Nok Tok is a Pipling resembling a bear. He has a blue-coloured body, tan skin, brown eyes, and has a short tuft on top of his head. He wears a light yellow T-shirt and has a small tail. Nok Tok is the practical one who enjoys fixing and building things. He is best friends with De Li. He is voiced by Oliver Dillon.
De Li
Colour:  Pink
De Li is a Pipling resembling a cat. She has a pink-coloured body, fair skin, blue eyes, pointed cat ears on top of her head, and a white tipped tail. She wears a light pink dress and a white flower on top of her head. De Li is very fond of her garden. She is best friends with Nok Tok. She is voiced by Sunday-James Ross.

Supporting characters 
 The Cheebies: A different group of six children who play Peeka and Yogo with the Piplings and go in for them in every episode. The Cheebies often find the solutions to the Piplings' problems.
 Narabugs: Four small butterfly creatures who are thought to be the Piplings' pets. Each one is coloured like its respective Pipling.
 Narmoles: Moles that live in Nara that are occasionally featured in episodes.
 Jumpybug: Jumpybug is a grasshopper who occasionally appears in episodes.

Format
Waybuloo is set in the fictional land of Nara. The main characters are the four Piplings, 3D CGI animated creatures with large heads and eyes and possessing the ability to fly and float around. They are made in Autodesk Maya, placed on a filmed background, with the second half of each twenty-minute show featuring human children (called the "Cheebies"). 

Yogo is a light form of Yoga practised by the Piplings. The Piplings demonstrate several poses inspired by things they see in their homeworld, Nara, such as owls, trees, and insects. Each group of poses indicates a certain group of Cheebies.

When the children (or Cheebies) arrive later during an episode, they then practice the same poses demonstrated by the Piplings at the start of the show.

The cue for both the Piplings and the Cheebies to perform Yogo is an ancient machine, which activates when sunlight falls upon it.

Yogo was developed by the show's producers in association with a Paediatrician and a Health and Safety Consultant. The leaflet produced by the BBC warns parents not to practise Yogo with their children if they are or have been ill, and always to speak to a GP before starting the program.

Peeka is a hide and seek game played by the Piplings when the Cheebies arrive at Nara.

At the end of every episode, when the Piplings find out their problems or are so happy, they experience Waybuloo, where all Piplings rise up towards the sky.

Production

Post-production, including audio, sound design and editing is done by Platform Post Production. in Toronto, Canada. Line produced by Matt Porter and the series producer is Simon Spencer (who works for Thomas & Friends), part of the independent company, RDF Media's subsidiary The Foundation.

Spin-off version
On September 8, 2011, Zodiak Kids announced a “Spin-Off” version of the series. This version would feature shortened 11-minute episodes with the addition of Dave Lamb as the narrator. The changes were said by the company as to be “constructed to work on multiple levels of humor in an effort to appeal to preschoolers and parents alike”. 

When this version premiered on CBeebies in January 2012, it was met with much criticism, with comments on the CBeebies Grown-Ups blog criticising Dave's narration. The negative feedback was so strong, that CBeebies decided to pull the spin-off version in favour of the original version on the very next night.

Episodes

Series 1 and 2

Footnote 1: S02E38 does not have a title recorded, although it has been aired by the BBC.

Series 3
Series 3 aired on CBeebies beginning 3 October 2011.

DVD releases

United Kingdom
DVD releases of the series were released by 2Entertain. Later DVDs were released by Delta Leisure.

Canada
In February 2010, DHX Media announced that Nelvana Enterprises would be the show's Canadian Home Video partner.

See also
Holland Publishing

Notes

References

External sources
BBC iPlayer with episodes aired in series 2

External links
 

Waybuloo on Treehouse Website

2009 British television series debuts
2009 Canadian television series debuts
2012 British television series endings
2012 Canadian television series endings
BBC children's television shows
2000s British children's television series
2000s Canadian animated television series
2010s British children's television series
2010s Canadian animated television series
British children's animated television shows
Canadian children's animated television series
Treehouse TV original programming
Canadian computer-animated television series
Television series by Banijay
Television series by DHX Media
Animated television series about bears
Animated television series about cats
Animated television series about monkeys
Animated television series about rabbits and hares
CBeebies
British preschool education television series
Canadian preschool education television series
Animated preschool education television series
2000s preschool education television series
2010s preschool education television series